King Abdullah City for Female Students, officially the King Abdullah City for Female Students at Al-Imam University, is a women's only education enclave in western part of the premises of Imam Mohammad Ibn Saud Islamic University in Riyadh, Saudi Arabia. Inaugurated in 2010, it costed two-billion Saudi riyals (533 million USD) and later on incorporated three female students study centers of al-Batha, al-Malaz and al-Nafal by 2012. Spanned across 100 hectares, it accommodates more than forty-thousand students from kindergarten to post-graduation and includes six buildings, part of which is a library and students' lobby.

History 
In January 2006, King Abdullah laid the foundation stone for the construction for a two-billion Saudi riyals women's exclusive education zone within the premises of Imam Mohammad Ibn Saud Islamic University. In November 2010, after its inauguration, it was named after the monarch by the director of the university as 'King Abdullah Ibn Abdulaziz City for Female Students'.

By 2011, the university began the process of merging the three former satellite campuses of al-Batha, al-Malaz and al-Nafal into the education enclave as they struggled to operate in their respective residential areas. The transfer of al-Malaz and al-Nafal branches were completed by early 2012, except al-Batha branch due to lack of safety tests in the new buildings and was thus, delayed for some time.

Departments 

 Department of Performance Monitoring
 Department of Technical Affairs
 Department of Female Student Affairs

References 

Education in Riyadh
Women's universities and colleges in Saudi Arabia
Imam Muhammad ibn Saud Islamic University
2010 establishments in Saudi Arabia
Educational institutions established in 2010